Kalanchoe marmorata, the penwiper, is a species of flowering plant in the family Crassulaceae, native to Central and West Africa, from Zaire to Ethiopia, Sudan and Somalia.

The Latin specific epithet marmorata refers to the marbled surface of the leaves.

This plant has gained the Royal Horticultural Society's Award of Garden Merit.

References

marmorata
Taxa named by John Gilbert Baker